Edith Stein (religious name Saint Teresia Benedicta a Cruce ; also known as Saint Teresa Benedicta of the Cross or Saint Edith Stein; 12 October 1891 – 9 August 1942) was a German Jewish philosopher who converted to Christianity and became a Discalced Carmelite nun. She is canonized as a martyr and saint of the Catholic Church; she is also one of six patron saints of Europe.

She was born into an observant Jewish family, but had become an agnostic by her teenage years. Moved by the tragedies of World War I, in 1915, she took lessons to become a nursing assistant and worked in an infectious diseases hospital. After completing her doctoral thesis at the University of Freiburg in 1916, she obtained an assistantship there.

From reading the life of the reformer of the Carmelite Order, Saint Teresa of Ávila, Edith Stein was drawn to the Christian faith. She was baptized on 1 January 1922 into the Catholic Church. At that point, she wanted to become a Discalced Carmelite nun but was dissuaded by her spiritual mentor, the abbot of Beuron Archabbey. She then taught at a Catholic school of education in Speyer. As a result of the requirement of an "Aryan certificate" for civil servants promulgated by the Nazi government in April 1933 as part of its Law for the Restoration of the Professional Civil Service, she had to quit her teaching position.

Edith Stein was admitted as a postulant to the Discalced Carmelite monastery in Cologne on 14 October, on the first vespers of the feast of Saint Teresa of Ávila, and received the religious habit as a novice in April 1934, taking the religious name Teresia Benedicta a Cruce (Teresia in remembrance of Saint Teresa of Ávila, Benedicta in honour of Saint Benedict of Nursia). She made her temporary vows on 21 April 1935, and her perpetual vows on 21 April 1938.

The same year, Teresa Benedicta a Cruce and her biological sister Rosa, by then also a convert and an extern (tertiary of the Order, who would handle the community's needs outside the monastery), were sent to the Carmelite monastery in Echt, Netherlands, for their safety. In response to the pastoral letter from the Dutch bishops on July 26, 1942, in which they made the treatment of the Jews by the Nazis a central theme, all baptized Catholics of Jewish origin (according to police reports, 244 people) were arrested by the Gestapo on the following Sunday, 2 August 1942. They were sent to the Auschwitz concentration camp, where they were murdered in a gas chamber on 9 August 1942.

Early life

Edith Stein was born in Breslau (now Wrocław, Poland), Lower Silesia, into an observant Jewish family. She was the youngest of 11 children and was born on Yom Kippur, the holiest day of the Hebrew calendar; these facts combined to make her a favorite of her mother. She was a very gifted child who enjoyed learning, in a home where her mother encouraged critical thinking, and she greatly admired her mother's strong religious faith. By her teenage years, however, Stein had become an agnostic.

Though her father died while she was young, her widowed mother was determined to give her children a thorough education and consequently sent Edith to study at the Schlesische Friedrich-Wilhelms-Universität in Breslau. At age 19, Stein moved with her family to Breslau to a house bought by her mother, which she later described in her Autobiography. Today, Edith Stein House hosts a museum dedicated to the history of the Stein family.

Academic career
In April 1913, Stein arrived at the University of Göttingen in order to study for the summer semester with Edmund Husserl. By the end of the summer, she had decided to pursue her doctoral degree in philosophy under Husserl and chose empathy as her thesis topic. Her studies were interrupted in July 1914 because of the outbreak of World War I. She then served as a volunteer wartime Red Cross nurse in an infectious diseases hospital at Mährisch Weißkirchen in 1915. In 1916, Stein moved to the University of Freiburg in order to complete her dissertation on Empathy. Shortly before receiving her degree from Freiburg she agreed to become Husserl's assistant there. In this role, she differed with Husserl on important issues and made independent contributions to phenomenology as a whole.  Her dissertation entitled Das Einfühlungsproblem in seiner historischen Entwicklung und in phänomenologischer Betrachtung (The Empathy Problem as it Developed Historically and Considered Phenomenologically) was awarded a doctorate in philosophy with the summa cum laude honor. Stein then became a member of the faculty at Freiburg, where she worked until 1918 as a teaching assistant to Husserl, who had transferred to that institution. The University of Göttingen rejected her habilitation thesis in 1919. Although Stein passed her doctoral examination with distinction, her attempts to habilitate failed due to the fact that Stein was a woman.

Her rejected habilitation thesis, Beiträge zur philosophischen Begründung der Psychologie und der Geisteswissenschaften (Contributions to the Philosophical Foundations of Psychology and the Human Sciences), was published in the Jahrbuch für Philosophie und phänomenologische Forschung in 1922. She is categorized as a realistic phenomenologist.

While Stein had earlier contacts with Catholicism, it was her reading of the autobiography of the mystic Teresa of Ávila during summer holidays in Bad Bergzabern in 1921 that prompted her conversion and eventually the desire to seek the life of a Discalced Carmelite. Baptized on 1 January 1922, and dissuaded by her spiritual advisers from immediately seeking entry to the enclosed and hidden life of a Carmelite nun, Stein obtained a position to teach at the Dominican nuns' school in Speyer from 1923 to 1931. While there, Stein translated Thomas Aquinas' De Veritate (Of Truth) into German, familiarized herself with Catholic philosophy in general and tried to bridge the phenomenology of her former teacher, Husserl, to Thomism. She visited Husserl and Heidegger at Freiburg in April 1929, the same month that Heidegger gave a speech to Husserl on his 70th birthday. In 1932 she became a lecturer at the Catholic Church-affiliated Institute for Scientific Pedagogy in Münster, but antisemitic legislation passed by the Nazi government forced her to resign the post in 1933. In a letter to Pope Pius XI, she denounced the Nazi regime and asked the Pope to openly denounce the regime "to put a stop to this abuse of Christ's name."

Her letter received no answer, and it is not known for certain whether the Pope ever saw it. However, in 1937 the Pope issued an encyclical written in German, Mit brennender Sorge (according to its German first words, lit. "With deep anxiety"), in which he criticized Nazism, listed violations of the Concordat between Germany and the Church of 1933, and condemned antisemitism.

Discalced Carmelite nun and martyr
Stein entered the Discalced Carmelite monastery St. Maria vom Frieden (Our Lady of Peace) in Cologne-Lindenthal in October 1933 and took the religious name Teresia Benedicta a Cruce (Teresa Benedicta of the Cross). In Cologne she wrote her metaphysical book Endliches und ewiges Sein (Finite and Eternal Being), which attempted to combine the philosophies of St. Thomas Aquinas, Duns Scotus and Husserl.

To avoid the growing Nazi threat, the Order transferred Edith and her sister, Rosa, who was also a convert and an extern sister of the Carmel, to the Discalced Carmelite monastery in Echt, Netherlands. There she wrote Studie über Joannes a Cruce: Kreuzeswissenschaft ("Studies on John of the Cross: The Science of the Cross"). In her testament of 9 June 1939 she wrote: 

Stein's move to Echt prompted her to be more devout and even more observant of the Carmelite rule. After having her teaching position revoked by the implementation of the Law for the Restoration of the Professional Civil Service, Stein quickly eased back into the role of instructor at the convent in Echt, teaching both fellow sisters and students within the community Latin and philosophy.

Even prior to the Nazi occupation of the Netherlands, Stein believed she would not survive the war, going so far as to write the Prioress to request her permission to "allow [Stein] to offer [her]self to the heart of Jesus as a sacrifice of atonement for true peace" and made a will. Her fellow sisters would later recount how Stein began "quietly training herself for life in a concentration camp, by enduring cold and hunger" after the Nazi invasion of the Netherlands in May 1940.

Ultimately, she would not be safe in the Netherlands. The Dutch Bishops' Conference had a public statement read in all churches across the nation on 20 July 1942 condemning Nazi racism. In a retaliatory response on 26 July 1942 the Reichskommissar of the Netherlands, Arthur Seyss-Inquart, ordered the arrest of all Jewish converts who had previously been spared. Along with two hundred and forty-three baptized Jews living in the Netherlands, Stein was arrested by the SS on 2 August 1942. Stein and her sister Rosa were imprisoned at the concentration camps of Amersfoort and Westerbork before being deported to Auschwitz. A Dutch official at Westerbork was so impressed by her sense of faith and calm, he offered her an escape plan. Stein vehemently refused his assistance, stating: "If somebody intervened at this point and took away [her] chance to share in the fate of [her] brothers and sisters, that would be utter annihilation."

On 7 August 1942, early in the morning, 987 Jews were deported to the Auschwitz concentration camp. It was probably on 9 August that Sister Teresa Benedicta of the Cross, her sister Rosa, and many more Jewish people were killed in a gas chamber.

Philosophy

Stein's development as a philosopher is frequently divided into three periods: an early, phenomenological (1916-25), a middle, comparative (1925-33) and a late, Christian (1935-42). In reality the same factors work themselves out throughout her work and propels it forward: 1. a profound understanding of and commitment to the phenomenological method as taught by Husserl and Reinach; 2. a deep sense of responsibility to the other for what we believe and 3. an acceptance of my own inability to form a complete, meaningful worldview without divine assistance. The three periods are best understood as stages of integration of these three factors, with Stein's baptism New Year's Day 1922, marking a decisive step on the way and her entering Carmel 14 October 1933 marking another.

The early phenomenological period (1916-25) 
Stein's dissertation on empathy was according to her own account an attempt to fill a gap in Husserl's work. In her autobiographical Life in a Jewish Family, she recalled that he took empathy to be the crucial act in which intersubjectivity was established, but nowhere detailed exactly what was meant by it. She therefore wanted to undertake this task and thereby clarify this crucial idea for the development of the phenomenological movement. While working as Husserl's assistant (1916-18) she edited Husserl's manuscripts of what was later to be published as Ideas II and III, and in the process came to understand the extraordinary importance this act has for our constitution of the intersubjective world, and in particular for the objects studied by psychology and the humanities. When she resigned from her position as Husserl's assistant, the phenomenological constitution of those objects: the psyche and the spirit, it was thus the first work she undertook. The result was the two treatises of Philosophy of Psychology and the Humanities, published in Husserl's Jahrbuch 1922: Psychic Causality and Individual and Community. From this period also dates Introduction to Philosophy, An Investigation Concerning the State, and very importantly Freedom and Grace.

The middle comparative period (1925-33) 
Encouraged to study and compare Thomas Aquinas' philosophy with that of the phenomenological movement, Stein embarked on a translation project of Aquinas' De Veritate, which was to be published in two volumes in 1932. The work, which translates Aquinas' way of thinking into a modern German idiom and restyles it as a contemporary academic treatise, occasioned that Stein engaged with Aquinas' thought as a phenomenologist, i.e. as someone interested in the matters discussed by Aquinas, as distinct from providing an interpretation of Aquinas' thought or writing in prolongation of it as a thomist. The most important works from this period are 'Husserl and Aquinas: A Comparison', in which she discusses the differing methodologies of Husserl and Aquinas and accounts for their differences, Potency and Act, in which she attempts a phenomenological investigation of 'potency' and 'act' and the twin work of anthropology: The Structure of the Human Person. Philosophical Anthropology and What is the Human Being? Theological Anthropology (the second volume remains a highly developed draft rather than a completed work, since Stein's lectures were canceled in 1933). During this period she also lectures on women's education and vocation and on education in general to very large audiences and to great acclaim. In these lectures, published in ESGA 13 and ESGA 16, she works out for herself the important questions concerning social type and essence, which find a fuller development in The Structure of the Human Person.

The later Christian period (1934-42) 
The first task Stein was assigned in the monastery was the writing of her incomplete autobiography, Life in a Jewish Family, a confession of her life as much as an apology in the literal sense for being of Jewish descent. Her next assignment was to prepare Potency and Act for publication, a task she accomplished by writing a new book: Finite and Eternal Being – An Ascent to the Meaning of Being. This work proposed a phenomenological doctrine of being (Seinslehre), which knows itself to be Christian, i.e. as taking Christian Revelation to contribute towards the view of the world in which it looks for and finds the meaning of being in being's unfolding. Stein also worked on Dionysius the Areopagite, translating his works into German and writing (for him) a work supposed to be lost on symbolic theology. Stein's final work, the Science of the Cross, was a commentary on St. John of the Cross, which developed the specifically Carmelite understanding of the depths of the soul, already of interest to Stein in her early work.

Legacy and veneration

Teresa Benedicta of the Cross was beatified as a martyr on 1 May 1987 in Cologne, Germany, by Pope John Paul II and then canonized by him 11 years later on 11 October 1998 in Rome. The miracle that was the basis for her canonization is the cure of Benedicta McCarthy, a little girl who had swallowed a large amount of paracetamol (acetaminophen), which causes hepatic necrosis. The young girl's father, Emmanuel Charles McCarthy, a priest of the Melkite Greek Catholic Church, immediately called together relatives and prayed for Teresa's intercession. Shortly thereafter the nurses in the intensive care unit saw her sit up, completely healthy. Ronald Kleinman, a pediatric specialist at Massachusetts General Hospital in Boston who treated the girl, testified about her recovery to Church tribunals, stating: "I was willing to say that it was miraculous." McCarthy would later attend Sr. Teresa Benedicta's canonization.

Teresa Benedicta of the Cross is one of the six patron saints of Europe, together with Benedict of Nursia, Cyril and Methodius, Bridget of Sweden, and Catherine of Siena.

Today there are many schools named in tribute to her, for example in her hometown, Lubliniec, Poland  Darmstadt, Germany, Hengelo, Netherlands, and Mississauga, Ontario, Canada. Also named for her are a women's dormitory at the University of Tübingen and a classroom building at The College of the Holy Cross in Worcester, Massachusetts.

Lubliniec in Poland hosts Edith Stein Museum (Muzeum Pro Memoria Edith Stein) localised on the first floor of the Courant family house (Edith Stein's grandparents' family home).  Wroclaw hosts a museum called Edith Stein House localised in the house Edith's mother bought for the family in 1919 on the street then called Michaelisstrasse 38 (today Nowowiejska 38).

In Vienna, the Edith-Stein-Haus at Ebendorferstraße 8 is the main location of the Catholic University Chaplaincy and the university pastoral care of the Archdiocese of Vienna. In the spirit of Karl Strobl's model of the "Catholic Student House", the house is also home to a chapel consecrated to Edith Stein as well as a dormitory for about 90 students.

The philosopher Alasdair MacIntyre published a book in 2006 titled Edith Stein: A Philosophical Prologue, 1913–1922, in which he contrasted her living of her own personal philosophy with Martin Heidegger, whose actions during the Nazi era, according to MacIntyre, suggested a "bifurcation of personality."

Playwright Arthur Giron wrote Edith Stein, a play that was inspired by Stein's life. It was produced at the Pittsburgh Public Theater in 1988.

In 1988, Edith Stein was pictured on a German postage stamp with Rupert Mayer SJ in honor of their beatification.

In 1995, Hungarian film director Márta Mészáros made a movie about the life and death of Edith Stein with the title A hetedik szoba (The Seventh Room/Chamber), starring Maia Morgenstern.

In 1999, a memorial statue by German sculptor Bert Gerresheim was dedicated in Cologne, Germany. The statue comprises three different views of Stein reflecting her Jewish and Christian faith, and a pile of empty shoes representing the victims of the holocaust.

In 2007, Stein's life and work was dramatised in the novel Winter Under Water (Picador, London) by author James Hopkin.

In 2008, the first Stolperstein that was ever laid in Poland was placed near Edith Stein's childhood home at 38 ul. Nowowiejska (formerly the Michaelisstraße) in Wrocław. Other Stolpersteine for her are in Cologne (several) and Freiburg.

In 2009, her bust was installed at the Walhalla Memorial near Regensburg, Germany. In June 2009 the International Association for the Study of the Philosophy of Edith Stein (IASPES) was founded, and held its first international conference at Maynooth University, Ireland, in order to advance the philosophical writings of Stein.

On 6 June 2014, the 70th anniversary of D-Day, a bell dedicated to her was named by Prince Charles at Bayeux Cathedral.

Also in 2014, the book Edith Stein and Regina Jonas: Religious Visionaries in the Time of the Death Camps, by Emily Leah Silverman, was published.

In 2022, Stein was officially added to the Episcopal Church liturgical calendar with a feast day on 9 August.

Controversy as to the cause of her murder
The beatification of St. Teresa Benedicta as a martyr generated criticism. Critics argued that she was murdered because she was Jewish by birth, rather than for her Christian faith, and that, in the words of Daniel Polish, the beatification seemed to "carry the tacit message encouraging conversionary activities" because "official discussion of the beatification seemed to make a point of conjoining Stein's Catholic faith with her death with 'fellow Jews' in Auschwitz." The position of the Catholic Church is that St. Teresa Benedicta also died because of the Dutch episcopacy's public condemnation of Nazi racism in 1942; in other words, that she died because of the moral teaching of the Church and is thus a true martyr.

Gallery

Bibliography 

For a detailed chronology of Stein's writings see IASPES' website.

Primary literature

In German 

 1917, Zum Problem der Einfühlung Halle: Buchdruckerei des Waisenhauses. (Doctoral Thesis). 
1916-1220, Einführung in die Philosophie, lectures taught at a proseminar in Freiburg in 1916-1918 and, later, privately in Breslau in Edith Stein House in 1920
 1921, Freiheit und Gnade. This work has for years been wrongly identified and quoted as Die ontische Struktur der Person und ihre erkenntnistheoretische Problematik, a title that appeared in print after WWII due to an incorrect connection between title page and work.
1922, Beiträge zur philosophischen Begründung der Psychologie und der Geisteswissenschaften, in Jahrbuch für Philosophie und phänomenologische Forschung 5, Halle: Max Niemeyer, 1-284.
1924, Was ist Phänomenologie? 
1924, Was ist Philosophie? Ein Gespräch zwischen Edmund Husserl und Thomas von Aquino
 1925, Eine Untersuchung über den Staat, in Jahrbuch für Philosophie und phänomenologische Forschung 7, Halle: Max Niemeyer, 1-123.
 1929, Husserls Phänomenologie und die Philosophie des heiligen Thomas von Aquino. Versuch einer Gegenüberstellung, in Festschrift Edmund Husserl zum 70. Geburtstag gewidmet, (Jahrbuch für Philosophie und phänomenologische Forschung 10), Ergänzungsband, Halle: Max Niemeyer, 315–338.
1930/1931, Die weltanschauliche Bedeutung der Phänomenologie
1931, Potenz und Akt. Studien zu einer Philosophie des Seins
1932, Der Aufbau der menschlichen Person. Vorlesung zur philosophischen Anthropologie
1933, Was ist der Mensch? Theologische Anthropologie. Das Menschenbild unseres Glaubens
1928-1933, Die Frau. Fragestellungen und Reflexionen
1935/1936, Endliches und ewiges Sein. Versuch eines Aufstiegs zum Sinn des Seins, written with two supplements:
Die Seelenburg zu Endliches und ewiges Sein
Martin Heidegger’s Existenzphilosophie
1940/1941, Wege der Gotteserkenntnis. Studie zu Dionysius Areopagita
1941/1942, Kreuzeswissenschaft. Studie über Johannes vom Kreuz
1962, Welt und Person (posthumous publication)

Contemporary critical edition 
(Edith Stein Gesamtausgabe, Herder 2000-2020) with English and Polish translations available
 ESGA 1: Stein E., Aus dem Leben einer jüdischen Familie und weitere autobiographische Beiträge, Herder, Freiburg 2002. 
 English translation: CWES 1: Life in a Jewish Family: Her Unfinished Autobiographical Account, trans. Josephine Koeppel in: The Collected Works of Edith Stein. Volume 1, ICS Publications, Washington D.C. 1986;
 Polish translation: ESGA PL 1: Dzieje pewnej rodziny żydowskiej, trans. Immakulata J. Adamska, Wydawnictwo Karmelitów Bosych, Cracow 2005.
 ESGA 2: Stein E., Selbstbildnis in Briefen I. Erster Teil 1916-1933, Herder, Freiburg 2000. 
 English translation: CWES 5: Self-portrait in Letters 1916-1942, trans. Josephine Koeppel in: The Collected Works of Edith Stein. Volume 1, ICS Publications, Washington D.C. 1993.
 Polish translation: Autoportret z listów I, trans. Immakulata J. Adamska, Anna Talarek, Wydawnictwo Karmelitów Bosych, Cracow 2003.
 ESGA 3: Stein E., Selbstbildnis in Briefen II. Zweiter Teil 1933-1942, Herder, Freiburg 2000. 
 Polish translation: ESGA PL 3: Autoportret z listów II, trans. Immakulata J. Adamska, Anna Talarek, Wydawnictwo Karmelitów Bosych, Cracow 2003.
 ESGA 4: Stein E., Selbstbildnis in Briefen III. Briefe an Roman Ingarden, Herder, Freiburg 2005. 
 English translation: CWES 12: Self-Portrait in Letters, trans. Hugh Candler Hunt, ICS Publications, Washington D.C. 2001.
 Polish translation ESGA PL 4: Autoportret z listów. Cz. 3. Listy do Romana Ingardena trans. Małgorzata Klentak-Zabłocka, Andrzej Wajs, Wydawnictwo Karmelitów Bosych, Cracow 2003; an older Polish translation: PL 4: Spór o prawdę istnienia. Listy Edith Stein do Romana Ingardena, trans. Małgorzata Klentak-Zabłocka, Andrzej Wajs, Wydawnictwo M, Warsaw 1994.
 ESGA 5: Stein E., Zum Problem der Einfühlung, Herder, Freiburg-Basel-Wien 2008. 
 English translation: CWES 3: On the problem of empathy, trans. Waltraut Stein, ICS Publications, Washington D.C. 1989.
 Polish translation: O zagadnieniu wczucia, trans. Danuta Gierulanka, Jerzy F. Gierula, Znak, Cracow 1988.
 ESGA 6: Stein E., Beiträge zur philosophischen Begründung der Psychologie und der Geisteswissenschaften, Herder, Freiburg-Basel-Wien 2010. 
 English translation: CWES 7: Philosophy of Psychology and the Humanities, trans. Mary Catharine Baseheart, Marianne Sawicki, ICS Publications, Washington D.C. 2000;
 Polish translation: ESGA PL 6: Filozofia psychologii i humanistyki, trans. Piotr Janik SJ, Marcin Baran SJ, Jolanta Gaca, Wydawnictwo Karmelitów Bosych, Cracow 2016.
 ESGA 7: Stein E., Eine Untersuchung über den Staat, Herder, Freiburg-Basel-Wien 2006. 
 English translation: CWES 10: An Investigation Concerning the State, trans. Marianne Sawicki, ICS Publication, Washington D.C. 2006.
 ESGA 8: Stein E., Einführung in die Philosophie, Herder, Freiburg-Basel-Wien 2004. 
 No translation is available.
 ESGA 9: Stein E., ‘Freiheit und Gnade’ und weitere Beiträge zu Phänomenologie und Ontologie, Herder, Freiburg-Basel-Wien 2014. 
 English translation: CWES 8: Husserl and Aquinas. A Comparison, in: CWES 8: Knowledge and Faith, trans. Walter Redmond, ICS Publications, Washington D.C. 2000, pp. 1-64. Older translation is available in: M. C. Baseheart, Person in the World: Introduction to the Philosophy of Edith Stein, Kluwer, Dordrecht 1997, pp. 129-144, transl. by M. C. Baseheart.
 Polish translation of Was Ist Philosophie? Ein Gespräch zwischen Edmund Husserl und Thomas von Aquino is Co to jest filozofia? Rozmowa między Edmundem Husserlem a Tomaszem z Akwinu, in: PL 9: Światło rozumu i wiary. Duchowa droga Edyty Stein św. Teresy Benedykty od Krzyża, Totaldruk, Poznań 2002, pp. 29-77.
 ESGA 10: Stein E., Potenz und Akt. Studien zu einer Philosophie des Seins, Herder, Freiburg-Basel-Wien 2005. 
 English translation: CWES 11: Potency and Act, Studies Toward a Philosophy of Being, trans. Walter Redmond, ICS Publications, Washington D.C. 2009.
 ESGA 11/12: Stein E., Endliches und ewiges Sein. Versuch eines Aufstiegs zum Sinn des Seins. Anhang: Martin Heideggers Existenzphilosophie. Die Seelenburg, Herder, Freiburg-Basel-Wien 2006. 
 English translation: CWES 9: Finite and eternal being, trans. K. F. Reinhardt, ICS Publications, Washington D.C. 2002.
 Polish translation: PL 11/12a: Byt skończony a byt wieczny, trans. Immakulata J. Adamska OCD, W drodze, Poznań 1995. The appendixes (Die Seelenburg and Martin Heideggers Existenzphilosophie) are translated in: PL 11/12b: Twierdza duchowa, trans. Immakulata J. Adamska, Zysk i S-ka, Poznań 2006, 93-122 and 135-203.
 ESGA 13: Stein E., Die Frau. Fragestellungen und Reflexionen, Freiburg-Basel-Wien 2000, Herder. 
 English translation: CWES 2: The Collected Works of Edith Stein. Volume II. Essays on Woman, trans. F. M. Oben, Washington D.C. 1996, ICS Publications.
 Polish translation: ESGA PL 13: Kobieta. Pytania i refleksje, trans. Wiesław Szymona, Wydawnictwo Karmelitów Bosych, Cracow 2015.
 ESGA 14: Stein E., Der Aufbau der menschlichen Person. Vorlesung zum philosophischen Anthropologie, Freiburg-Basel-Wien 1994, Herder, Freiburg 2004. 
 Polish translation: ESGA PL 14: Budowa osoby ludzkiej. Wykład z antropologii filozoficznej, trans. Grzegorz Sowinski, Wydawnictwo Karmelitów Bosych, Cracow 2015.
 Italian translation: La struttura della persona umana, trans. L. Gelber-M. Linssen, M. d’Ambra, Città Nuova, Rome 2000.
 ESGA 15: Stein E., Was is der Mensch? Theologische Anthropologie, Freiburg-Basel-Wien 2005, Herder. 
 Polish translation: ESGA PL 15: Czym jest człowiek? Antropologia teologiczna, trans. Grzegorz Sowinski, Wydawnictwo Karmelitów Bosych, Cracow 2012.
 ESGA 16: Stein E., Bildung und Entfaltung der Individualität. Beiträge zum christlichen Erziehungsauftrag, Herder, Freiburg-Basel-Wien 2001.
 ESGA 17: Stein E., Wege der Gotteserkenntnis. Studie zu Dionysius Areopagita und Übersetzung seiner Werke, Herder, Freiburg-Basel-Wien 2013. 
 Polish translation: Drogi poznania Boga: studium o Dionizym Areopagicie i przekład jego dzieł, trans. Grzegorz Sowinski, Wydawnictwo Karmelitów Bosych, Cracow 2006.
 ESGA 18: Kreuzeswissenschaft. Studie über Johannes vom Kreuz, Herder, Freiburg-Basel-Wien 2003. 
 English translation: CWES 6: The Science of the Cross, trans. Josephine Koeppel, ICS Publications, Washington D.C. 2002;
 Polish translation: Wiedza Krzyża. Studium o św. Janie od Krzyża, trans. Immakulata J. Adamska, Grzegorz Sowinski, Wydawnictwo Karmelitów Bosych, Cracow 2013.
 ESGA 19: Geistliche Texte I, Freiburg-Basel-Wien 2009, Herder. 
 English translation: The Hidden Life: Essays, Meditations, Spiritual Texts, trans. Waltraut Stein in: The Collected Works of Edith Stein. Volume IV, ICS Publications, Washington D.C. 2014.
 ESGA 20: Geistliche Texte II, Freiburg-Basel-Wien 2007, Herder. 
 English translation: ESGA EN 4: The Hidden Life: Essays, Meditations, Spiritual Texts, trans. Waltraut Stein in: The Collected Works of Edith Stein. Volume IV, ICS Publications, Washington D.C. 2014.
 ESGA 21: Übersetzung von John Henry Newman, Die Idee der Universität, Freiburg-Basel-Wien 2014, Herder.
 ESGA 22: Übersetzung von John Henry Newman, Briefe und Texte zur ersten Lebenshälfte (1801–1846), Freiburg-Basel-Wien 2004, Herder.
 ESGA 23: Übersetzung: Des Hl. Thomas von Aquino Untersuchungen über die Wahrheit - Quaestiones disputatae de veritate 1, Freiburg-Basel-Wien 2014, Herder.
 ESGA 24: Übersetzung: Des Hl. Thomas von Aquino Untersuchungen über die Wahrheit - Quaestiones disputatae de veritate 2, Freiburg-Basel-Wien 2002, Herder.
 ESGA 25: Übersetzung von Alexandre Koyré, Descartes und die Scholastik, Freiburg-Basel-Wien 2008, Herder.
 ESGA 26: Übersetzung: Thomas von Aquin, Über das Seiende und das Wesen - De ente et essentia - mit den Roland-Gosselin-Exzerpten. Eingeführt und bearbeitet von Andreas Speer und Francesco Valerio Tommasi, Freiburg-Basel-Wien 2008, Herder.
 ESGA 27: Miscellanea thomistica, Freiburg-Basel-Wien 2013, Herder.

See also
 St. Teresa Benedicta of the Cross OCD, patron saint archive

Notes

References

Further reading
 
 
 
 
 
 
 Maskulak, Marian, ed. 2016. Edith Stein: Selected Writings. New York: Paulist Press.

External links

 International Association for the Study of the Philosophy of Edith Stein (IASPES)

 
 Index of Saints
 Edith-Stein homepage of the Diocese of Speyer
 Institute of Philosophy Edith Stein
 Associazione Italiana Edith Stein onlus
 Essays by Edith Stein at Quotidiana.org
 Letter of Saint Edith Stein to Pope Pius XI in 1933
 Official Edith Stein foundation in The Netherlands
 Edith Stein Biography - Emir-Stein Center

1891 births
1942 deaths
20th-century Christian saints
20th-century Christian mystics
20th-century essayists
20th-century German Catholic theologians
Women Christian theologians
20th-century German philosophers
20th-century German women writers
20th-century German translators
Beatifications by Pope John Paul II
Canonizations by Pope John Paul II
Carmelite mystics
Carmelite saints
Catholic saints and blesseds of the Nazi era
Christian continental philosophers and theologians
Christian female saints of the Late Modern era
Converts to Roman Catholicism from Judaism
Converts to Roman Catholicism from atheism or agnosticism
Discalced Carmelite nuns
German essayists
German Jews who died in the Holocaust
German people who died in Auschwitz concentration camp
20th-century German Roman Catholic nuns
German Roman Catholic saints
German women essayists
German women philosophers
Jewish philosophers
Latin–German translators
Military nurses
People from Echt-Susteren
People from the Province of Silesia
Writers from Wrocław
People killed by gas chamber by Nazi Germany
Phenomenologists
Catholic philosophers
Roman Catholics in the German Resistance
Thomists
University of Breslau alumni
University of Freiburg alumni
Academic staff of the University of Freiburg
University of Göttingen alumni
Women mystics
Women religious writers
Lists of stolpersteine in Germany